Moscow Township may refer to the following places in the United States:

 Moscow Township, Muscatine County, Iowa
 Moscow Township, Stevens County, Kansas, in Stevens County, Kansas
 Moscow Township, Michigan
 Moscow Township, Freeborn County, Minnesota
 Moscow Township, Cavalier County, North Dakota, in Cavalier County, North Dakota

Township name disambiguation pages